Thyrocopa megas is a moth of the family Xyloryctidae. It was first described by Lord Walsingham in 1907. It is endemic to the Hawaiian islands of Oahu and Maui.

The length of the forewings is about 13–18 mm. Adults are on wing at least from March to October. The ground color of the forewings is very light whitish brown with some brown scales. The discal area has several poorly defined, brownish spots in the cell. The hindwings are very light whitish brown. The fringe is almost white.

External links

Thyrocopa
Endemic moths of Hawaii
Moths described in 1907